The 2016 National League play-off Final, known as the 2016 Vanarama National League Promotion Final for sponsorship purposes, was an association football match between Forest Green Rovers and Grimsby Town on 15 May 2016 at Wembley Stadium in London. It was the 14th National League play-off Final, the first under the name National League and the ninth to be played at Wembley. Grimsby won the match 3–1 to earn promotion into League Two, returning into the Football League after a six-year absence.

Match

Details

Statistics

References

play-off Final 2016
2016
Play-off Final 2016
Play-off Final 2016
National League play-off Final
National League play-off final
Events at Wembley Stadium